Jalan Rantau (Negeri Sembilan state route ) is a major road in Negeri Sembilan, Malaysia.

List of junctions

Roads in Negeri Sembilan